Great Ghost Tales is an American horror television series that aired Live from July 6 until September 21, 1961. The program was the summer replacement for The Ford Show.

Premise
An anthology of scary stories hosted by Frank Gallop.

Cast
Among actors featured in the series included Robert Duvall, Lee Grant, Kevin McCarthy (actor), Mildred Dunnock, Collin Wilcox (actress), Lois Nettleton, Richard Thomas (actor), Salome Jens, and Arthur Hill (actor)

Episodes

References

External links
 

Great Ghost Tales at CVTA with episode list

1961 American television series debuts
1961 American television series endings
1960s American anthology television series
American horror fiction television series
English-language television shows
NBC original programming
American live television series